She's So Lovely is a 1997 American romantic drama film directed by Nick Cassavetes, written by John Cassavetes. At the time of its release, it received special attention because, eight years after his death, it was the first (and still only) posthumous film to feature previously unreleased material from John Cassavetes.

The film stars Sean Penn and John Travolta as the respective men who bid for the affection of Maureen Murphy Quinn (Robin Wright). Harry Dean Stanton co-stars as a friend of Penn's character, and James Gandolfini plays the abusive neighbor.

Plot
Eddie Quinn's unruly wife Maureen drinks and smokes to excess, even though she is pregnant. Eddie has troubles of his own, disappearing for days at a time. When she is physically and sexually assaulted by Kiefer, a neighbor, it is more than Eddie can handle. He shoots someone and lands in a psychiatric hospital.

Ten years go by. Eddie finally returns, only to find Maureen is now a clean, sober, solid citizen, married to a new man, Joey, and a mother of three children, one of whom is Eddie's own daughter. Eddie's return complicates and endangers all of their lives.

Cast
 Sean Penn as Eddie Quinn
 Robin Wright as Maureen Murphy Quinn
 John Travolta as Joey Giamonti
 James Gandolfini as Kiefer
 Harry Dean Stanton as Tony "Shorty" Russo
 Neill Barry as Michael
 Debi Mazar as Georgie
 Gena Rowlands as Miss Jane Green
 Susan Traylor as Lucinda
 Bobby Cooper as Cooper
 John Marshall Jones as Leonard
 Chloe Webb as Nancy Swearingen
 James Soravilla as Avi
 Jamie Bozian as Intern #1 (as James Bozian)
 Paul Johansson as Intern #2
 Justina Machado as Carmen Rodriguez as Lady Ticket Taker
 Tito Larriva as Lead Singer

Reception

Critical response
On Rotten Tomatoes the film has an approval rating of 66% based on 41 reviews.

Roger Ebert of the Chicago Sun-Times gave it 3 out of 4 stars and wrote: "What [Nick Cassavetes] understands is that if you want to see true weirdness, you don't look along skid row, where the motives are pretty easy to understand, but out in suburbia, where those green lawns can surround human time bombs."
Writing in Time Out New York, Andrew Johnston remarked: "Watching the films of John Cassavetes now, one is struck by how complex and human his characters are, compared with those in even the most sophisticated of today's independent films. This effect is even more pronounced in She's So Lovely, an unproduced Cassavetes script given the '90s treatment and filled with stars by the late director's son. The final product features some of the year's best performances...."

Awards
Sean Penn won the award for Best Actor at the 1997 Cannes Film Festival. Robin Wright received a nomination for Outstanding Performance by a Female Actor in a Leading Role at the 4th Screen Actors Guild Awards.

References

External links
 
 
 

1997 films
1997 romantic drama films
American independent films
American romantic drama films
Films directed by Nick Cassavetes
1997 independent films
1990s English-language films
1990s American films